

The Tineodidae or false plume moths are a family of moths with in some cases unusually modified wings: Like in some related moths, the wings of several Tineodidae are decomposed into several rigid spines. This is a small family, with about a global total of 20 species described to date; some undescribed species are known or suspected to exist however. They seem to be of Australian origin, where they are most diverse, but range through the Wallacea to Southeast and South Asia, and into the Pacific to the Marquesas Islands.

Description and ecology
These moths are usually small (with wingspans around 1–2 cm/less than 1 inch) and brownish in color. They have large compound eyes, thread-like antennae, and prominent labial palps. The body is slender, and the legs bear large spines.. The amount of wing modification varies in this family. Some genera (e.g. Cenoloba, Oxychirota and Tanycnema) resemble plume moths (superfamily Pterophoroidea), hence the common name "false plume moths". Others have little- or almost unmodified wings, and in some cases (e.g. Tineodes) at a casual glance look like snout moths (family Pyralidae). The forewings may be simply drawn out to a slim point, or deeply divided into two narrow lobes. The hindwings are typically quite short, and may also be divided into two lobes.

Feeding habits of the caterpillar larvae are not well known; while they all seem to feed on eudicots, there is no obvious preference for a particular lineage of these. Most Tineodidae larvae seem to be leaf miners as in closely related moth families. Those of Cenoloba obliteralis (and perhaps others) inhabit developing fruit instead, where they eat the young seeds.

Systematics and taxonomy
The relationships of this group are disputed, and they were in fact not even considered a possibly monophyletic lineage for long. Initially, these moths were believed to be unusual Pyralidae (snout moths) or Pterophoroidea (plume moths). Only in the late 19th century was their distinctness realized, yet they were not considered as a monophyletic group. Rather, the more unusual forms were treated as a distinct family Oxychirotidae. This was subsequently merged into the Tineodidae – which was originally established for the more conventional-looking false plume moths – when it became clear that the two groups are very close relatives.

Tineodidae are here united with the many-plumed moths (family Alucitidae) the superfamily Alucitoidea. It may be that these two groups are actually polyphyletic with regard to each other, and merging Tineodidae into Alucitidae and/or redelimiting the groups is warranted. In the taxonomic scheme used here, the closest living relatives of the Alucitoidea are considered the Pterophoroidea, but this is somewhat disputed. This would mean that the strong similarities between e.g. Tanycnema and the basal plume moth genus Agdistopis are not a coincidence.

The alternative approach assumes the fruitworm moths (Copromorphoidea) are the closest living relatives of the Alucitidae, including the latter in an expanded Copromorphoidea with the fruitworm moths and the fringe-tufted moths (family Epermeniidae). In this scheme, the Alucitoidea do not exist, and the Tineodidae are included in the Pterophoroidea. Ultimately however, it is the affiliations of the Copromorphidae (which seem to be basal Obtectomera, somewhat more advanced than the others) which would decide which scheme to use.

Genera
The genera presently placed here, sorted alphabetically, are: 

 Anomima Turner, 1922
 Carcantia Walker, 1859
 Cenoloba Walsingham, 1885
 Epharpastis Meyrick, 1887
 Euthesaura Turner, 1922
 Euthrausta Turner, 1922
 Neoxychirota Clarke, 1986
 Oxychirota Meyrick, 1885
 Palaeodes Hampson, 1913
 Tanycnema  Turner, 1922
 Tephroniopsis Amsel, 1961
 Tineodes Guenée in Boisduval & Guenée, 1854

Footnotes

References
This article draws heavily on the corresponding article in the Bokmål-language Wikipedia.
 . Version of 2008-MAR-06.
  (2011): Australian Faunal Directory – Tineodidae. Version of 2011-MAY-11. Retrieved 2011-SEP-24.
  (1986): Pyralidae and Microlepidoptera of the Marquesas Archipelago. Smithsonian Contributions to Zoology 416: 1–485. PDF fulltext (214 MB!)
  (2010): Tineodidae of Australia. Version of 2010-MAY-11. Retrieved 2011-SEP-24.
  (1991): Tentative reconstruction of the ditrysian phylogeny (Lepidoptera: Glossata). Entomologica Scandinavica 22(1): 69–95.  (HTML abstract)
  (2003): Alucitoidea. Version of 2003-JAN-01. Retrieved 2011-SEP-24.